Castelluccio Valmaggiore is a town and comune in the province of Foggia in the Apulia region of southeast Italy.

It takes its name from the castle built here by the Byzantines around 1000 AD (Castrum Vallis Maiors), as the fortification commanded the valley of the Celone river.

References

Cities and towns in Apulia
Castles in Italy